The Strip or the Las Vegas Strip is a stretch of Las Vegas Boulevard South south of the Las Vegas city limits.

The Strip may also refer to:

Media
The Strip (1951 film), a film-noir drama film directed by László Kardos and starring Mickey Rooney
The Strip (play), play by Phyllis Nagy for the Royal Court Theatre in 1995
The Strip (Australian TV series) (2008), an Australian television drama series
The Strip (NZ TV series) (2002–2003), a New Zealand television drama series
"The Strip" (The O.C.), a 2004 episode of The O.C., an American television drama series
The Strip (US TV series) (1999–2000), an American television drama series

Places
The Strip (Christchurch), two blocks of Oxford Terrace in the Christchurch Central City
Strip District, Pittsburgh, a neighborhood in Pittsburgh, Pennsylvania
Sunset Strip,  stretch of Sunset Boulevard in West Hollywood, California
 A drag strip at Las Vegas Motor Speedway

See also
 Strip (disambiguation)